1935 - Social Security Act, 
 1939 - Social Security Amendments of 1939, 
 1942 - Revenue Act of 1942, 
 1943 - 
 1943 - Revenue Act of 1943, 
 1945 - Federal Insurance Contributions Act, 
 1945 - Revenue Act of 1945, 
 1946 - Social Security Amendments of 1946, 
 1947 - Social Security Amendments of 1947, 
 1948 - Provision for Exclusion of Certain Newspaper and Magazine Vendors from Social Security Coverage, 
 1948 - Provision to Maintain Status Quo Concept of Employee, 
 1950 - Social Security Amendments of 1950, 
 1952 - Social Security Amendments of 1952, 
 1954 - Social Security Amendments of 1954, 
 1956 - Social Security Amendments of 1956, 
 1958 - Social Security Amendments of 1958, 
 1960 - Social Security Amendments of 1960, 
 1961 - Social Security Amendments of 1961, 
 1965 - Social Security Amendments of 1965, 
 1966 - Tax Adjustment Act of 1966, 
 1967 - Social Security Act Amendments, 
 1969 - Tax Reform Act of 1969, 
 1971 - Social Security Amendments, 
 1972 - Social Security Amendments, 
 1972 - Social Security Amendments of 1972 (Supplemental Security Income), 
 1973 - Social Security Benefits Increase, 
 1977 - Social Security Amendments of 1977, 
 1980 - Social Security Disability Amendments of 1980, 
 1980 - Reallocation of Social Security Taxes Between OASI and DI Trust Funds, 
 1980 - Retirement Test Amendments, 
 1981 - Omnibus Budget Reconciliation Act of 1981, 
 1981 - Social Security Amendments of 1981, 
 1983 - Internal Revenue Code of 1954 and Social Security Act, amendments.  
 This document describes minor changes: Social Security Tax rates on Virgin Islands income, Social Security Disability Changes (Benefits during Appeal, Periodic Reviews, Reconsiderations), and Offsets related to public pensions.
 1983 - Social Security Amendments of 1983,  
 This document describes the massive 1983 changes affecting the financing of the Social Security system.  
 1984 - Social Security Disability Benefits Reform Act of 1984, 
 1985 - Balanced Budget and Emergency Deficit Control Act, 
 1986 - Omnibus Budget Reconciliation Act of 1986, 
 1987 - Omnibus Budget Reconciliation Act of 1987, 
 1988 - Technical and Miscellaneous Revenue Act of 1988, 
 1989 - Omnibus Budget Reconciliation Act of 1989, 
 1990 - Omnibus Budget Reconciliation Act of 1990, 
 1993 - Omnibus Budget Reconciliation Act of 1993, 
 1994 - Social Security Administrative Reform Act, 
 1994 - Social Security Domestic Reform Act, 
 1996 - Senior Citizens' Right to Work Act of 1996, 
 1999 - Ticket to Work and Work Incentives Improvement Act, 
 2000 - Senior Citizens' Right to Work Act of 2000,

See also
List of United States federal legislation
Social Security (United States)
Social Security debate (United States)

References
Kollman, Geoffry and Carmen Solomon-Fears. 2002. Social Security: Major Decisions in the House and Senate 1935-2000. New York, NY: Novinka Books.

External links
 Social Security History, via the Social Security Administration
 Laws Amending the Social Security Act, via the Social Security Administration

Legislation
Social Security legislation
 Social Security legislation